Kunchi is a Local Government Area in Kano State, Nigeria. Its headquarters are in the town of Kunchi.

It has an area of 671 km and a population of 111,018 at the 2006 census.

The postal code of the area is 703.

References

Local Government Areas in Kano State